The 1985 WTA Swiss Open  was a women's tennis tournament played on outdoor clay courts in Lugano, Switzerland that was part of the 1985 Virginia Slims World Championship Series. It was the ninth edition of the tournament and was held from 20 May through 26 May 1985. Third-seeded Bonnie Gadusek won the singles title.

Finals

Singles
 Bonnie Gadusek defeated  Manuela Maleeva 6–2, 6–2
 It was Gadusek's 2nd singles title of the year and the 3rd of her career.

Doubles
 Bonnie Gadusek /  Helena Suková defeated  Bettina Bunge /  Eva Pfaff 6–2, 6–4

References

External links
 ITF tournament edition details

Swiss Open
WTA Swiss Open
1985 in Swiss tennis
1985 in Swiss women's sport